Thames is an electoral ward of the Borough of Reading, in the English county of Berkshire. It includes areas on both sides of both the River Thames and the River Kennet, to the north and east of the centre of Reading on the south bank, and to the east of the centre of Caversham on the north bank. It should not be confused with the ward of the same name that existed prior to the 2022 Reading Borough Council election, with which it has no area in common.

From the north-west in clockwise order, Thames Ward is bounded by the River Thames, Caversham Bridge, Abbotsmead Place, School Lane, and Gosbrook Road, including, in places, properties on both sides of the road. The ward boundary then loops to the east of Deans Farm, before following the River Thames again as far as Kennet Mouth, from where it proceeds up the River Kennet. It then cuts south through New Town to the Kings Road, which it follows to Forbury Road and the Vastern Road railway bridge. It then follows the Great Western Main Line as far as Cow Lane, which it follows back to the Thames. The ward shares borders with Caversham Heights, Caversham, Park, Redlands, Abbey and Battle wards of the Borough of Reading, along with the civil parish of Eye and Dunsden in Oxfordshire, and with the civil parish of Earley in the Borough of Wokingham.

As with all Reading wards, the ward elects three councillors to Reading Borough Council. Elections are generally held by thirds, with elections in three years out of four, although the 2022 elections were for all councillors due to the boundary changes. The ward councillors are currently Adele Barnett-Ward, Richard Davies and Nusrat Sultan, all of whom are members of the Labour Party.

The ward includes stretches of both the River Thames and River Kennet, with serval riverine islands including Pipers Island, Fry's Island and View Island, and several riverside parks including Thameside Promenade, Christchurch Meadows, Hills Meadow and Kings Meadow. The main campus of Reading College is also within the ward.

References

Wards of Reading